The 2003–04 Moldovan "B" Division was the 13th season of Moldovan football's third-tier league. There are 27 teams in the competition, in two groups, 14 in the North and 13 in the South.

"B" Division North

Final standings 
Tables at winter break:

Winner: Viişoara Mileştii Mici

"B" Division South

Final standings 
Table at winter break:

Winner: Olimp Tomai

External links 
 Moldova. Third Level 2003/04 - RSSSF
 "B" Division - moldova.sports.md

Moldovan Liga 2 seasons
3
Moldova